Fifth Harmony is an American four-piece girl group, consisting of members Ally Brooke, Normani Kordei, Dinah Jane, Lauren Jauregui and formerly Camila Cabello. The group began working on their debut EP, Better Together. It was released in 2013, following their exit from the second season of the American televised singing competition, The X Factor. At this time, the group contributed guest vocals on two covers, "When I Was Your Man" by Bruno Mars and "Mirrors" by Justin Timberlake, for Boyce Avenue's cover EP, Cover Collaborations, Volume 2. The first single released from their debut EP, Better Together, was "Miss Movin' On", a power pop song with a synth-backed chorus written by singer Julia Michaels among other writers. While the group had very limited songwriting credits in their EP, they are credited as writers on the promotional single, "Me & My Girls" with collaborations from Patrick James Bianco, Beau Alexandrè Dozier and John Ryan. Their EP was subsequently released four times with an acoustic version, a remixes EP, and two Spanish versions, one standard and one acoustic.

The group's debut studio album, Reflection, saw collaborations with different sets of producers and songwriters as well as artists who previously worked on their EP. A returning composer includes Julian Bunetta who co-wrote the titular track. Different writers and producers were heavily involved in making this album including Taylor Parks, and Chris Aparri and Victoria Monét, who was the most involved co-writing and co-producing a total of four tracks. "Worth It, the third and final single released from Reflection, incorporates strong elements of Balkan music in its production, a trademark of Ori Kaplan, who is credited as a co-producer. The previous single, "Sledgehammer", the synthpop and electronic dance song with new wave and 1980's music style influences was penned by Meghan Trainor with additional writing from Jonas Seberg and Sean Douglas. The lyrical content cast a more mature, reflective, darker and somber tone over Better Together, which critics noted as a step away from the group's "teen" image in their previous EP. Fifth Harmony's second studio album, 7/27 saw the group experiment with new genres such as tropical house, reggae and funk. New songwriters and producers for this record include Joshua Coleman, musician Kygo and Dallas Koehlke. Coleman co-wrote album's lead single, "Work from Home", the R&B track with trap and tropical house influences with help from the song's featured artist, Ty Dolla Sign. The group is credited as songwriters in only one song, "All in My Head (Flex)" with additional writing from Eriksen and Hermansen from Stargate and production from Monét, among other credits.

The group's third album, Fifth Harmony, was released on August 25, 2017 following the departure of group member Camila Cabello. It was preceded by the lead single, "Down", which was released June 2 and features guest vocals from rapper Gucci Mane. A promotional single from the album "Angel", was released on August 10 and the second single, "He Like That" was released on August 25. The remaining members (Brooke, Jauregui, Kordei and Hansen) co-wrote at least half of the songs from the album, and in general had more freedom in choosing which songs to record and produce, as well as suggesting song ideas. The album's main genres are pop, R&B, hip-hop and tropical house.

Released songs

Notes

References

See also
 Fifth Harmony discography

Fifth Harmony